Lunella granulata, common name the granulated moon turban, is a species of sea snail, a marine gastropod mollusk in the family Turbinidae, the turban snails.

Description
The size of the shell varies between 20 mm and 40 mm. The umbilicate shell is typically more elongated than Lunella coronata with an altitude about equalling the diameter. It is finely granulose all over, with subsutural and coronal series of tubercles, and sometimes one or two additional series upon the median part of body whorl.

Distribution
This marine species occurs from Taiwan to South Africa.

Notes
Additional information regarding this species:
 Taxonomic status: Some authors place the name in the subgenus Turbo (Lunella)

References

 Alf A. & Kreipl K. (2011) The family Turbinidae. Subfamily Turbinidae, Genus Turbo. Errata, corrections and new information on the genera Lunella, Modelia and Turbo (vol. I). In: G.T. Poppe & K. Groh (eds), A Conchological Iconography. Hackenheim: Conchbooks. pp. 69–72, pls 96–103.

External links

 Chiu, Y. W., Bor, H., Tan, M. S., Lin, H. D., & Jean, C. T. (2013). Phylogeography and genetic differentiation among populations of the moon turban snail Lunella granulata Gmelin, 1791 (Gastropoda: Turbinidae). International Journal of Molecular Sciences, 14(5), 9062–9079. 
 

granulata
Gastropods described in 1791
Taxa named by Johann Friedrich Gmelin